The linear-nonlinear-Poisson (LNP) cascade model is a simplified functional model of neural spike responses. It has been successfully used to describe the response characteristics of neurons in early sensory pathways, especially the visual system.  The LNP model is generally implicit when using reverse correlation or the spike-triggered average to characterize neural responses with white-noise stimuli.

There are three stages of the LNP cascade model.  The first stage consists of a linear filter, or linear receptive field, which describes how the neuron integrates stimulus intensity over space and time.  The output of this filter then passes through a nonlinear function, which gives the neuron's instantaneous spike rate as its output.  Finally, the spike rate is used to generate spikes according to an inhomogeneous Poisson process.

The linear filtering stage performs dimensionality reduction, reducing the high-dimensional spatio-temporal stimulus space to a low-dimensional feature space, within which the neuron computes its response.  The nonlinearity converts the filter output to a (non-negative) spike rate, and accounts for nonlinear phenomena such as spike threshold (or rectification) and response saturation.  The Poisson spike generator converts the continuous spike rate to a series of spike times, under the assumption that the probability of a spike depends only on the instantaneous spike rate.

The model offers a useful approximation of neural activity, allowing scientists to derive reliable estimates from a mathematically simple formula.

Mathematical formulation

Single-filter LNP
Let  denote the spatio-temporal stimulus vector at a particular instant, and
Let  denote the nonlinearity, a scalar function with non-negative output. Then the LNP model specifies that, in the limit of small time bins, 
 .
For finite-sized time bins, this can be stated precisely as the probability of observing y spikes in a single bin: 
 

Multi-filter LNP
For neurons sensitive to multiple dimensions of the stimulus space, the linear stage of the LNP model can be generalized to a bank of linear filters, and the nonlinearity becomes a function of multiple inputs.  Let  denote the set of linear filters that capture a neuron's stimulus dependence.  Then the multi-filter LNP model is described by
 
or
 
where  is a matrix whose columns are the filters .

Estimation 
The parameters of the LNP model consist of the linear filters  and the nonlinearity .  The estimation problem (also known as the problem of neural characterization) is the problem of determining these parameters from data consisting of a time-varying stimulus and the set of observed spike times. Techniques for estimating the LNP model parameters include:
 moment-based techniques, such as the spike-triggered average or spike-triggered covariance
 with information-maximization or maximum likelihood techniques.

Related models 
 The LNP model provides a simplified, mathematically tractable approximation to more biophysically detailed single-neuron models such as the integrate-and-fire or Hodgkin–Huxley model.
 If the nonlinearity  is a fixed invertible function, then the LNP model is a generalized linear model.  In this case,  is the inverse link function.
 An alternative to the LNP model for neural characterization is the Volterra kernel or Wiener kernel series expansion, which arises in classical nonlinear systems-identification theory.  These models approximate a neuron's input-output characteristics using a polynomial expansion analogous to the Taylor series, but do not explicitly specify the spike-generation process.

See also
Random neural network
Spike-triggered average
Spike-triggered covariance

References

Computational neuroscience
Stochastic models